The Golden Age of Detective Fiction was an era of classic murder mystery novels of similar patterns and styles, predominantly in the 1920s and 1930s.

The Golden Age proper is, in practice, usually taken to refer to a type of fiction which was predominant in the 1920s and 1930s but had been written since at least 1911 and is still being written today. In his history of the detective story, Bloody Murder: From the Detective Story to the Crime Novel, the author Julian Symons heads two chapters devoted to the Golden Age as "the Twenties" and "the Thirties". Symons notes that Philip Van Doren Stern's article, "The Case of the Corpse in the Blind Alley" (1941) "could serve ... as an obituary for the Golden Age."

Most of the authors of the Golden Age were British: Margery Allingham (1904–1966), Anthony Berkeley (aka Francis Iles, 1893–1971), Nicholas Blake (1904–1972), Lynn Brock (1877–1943), G. K. Chesterton (1874–1936), Dame Agatha Christie (1890–1976), John Creasey (1908-1973), Edmund Crispin (1921–1978), Freeman Wills Crofts (1879–1957), R. Austin Freeman (1862–1943), Joseph Jefferson Farjeon (1883–1955), Cyril Hare (1900–1958), Georgette Heyer (1902–1974), Anne Hocking (1890–1966),  Michael Innes (1906–1993), Msgr. Ronald Knox (1888–1957), E. C. R. Lorac (1894–1958), Philip MacDonald (1900–1980), Gladys Mitchell (1901–1983), John Rhode (1884–1964), Dorothy L. Sayers (1893–1957), Josephine Tey (1896–1952), Patricia Wentworth (1877-1961), Henry Wade (1887–1969), and many more. Dame Ngaio Marsh (1895–1982), was a New Zealander but was also British, as was her detective Roderick Alleyn. Georges Simenon was from Belgium and wrote in French; his detective, Jules Maigret, was a Frenchman. Some writers, such as Mary Roberts Rinehart, S. S. Van Dine, Earl Derr Biggers, John Dickson Carr, Ellery Queen, Erle Stanley Gardner, Rex Stout and Elizabeth Daly, were American but had similar styles. Others, such as Raymond Chandler (American but also British), Dashiell Hammett, and James M. Cain, had a more hard-boiled, American style.

The Queens of Crime is a term for authors Christie, Sayers, Allingham and Marsh.

Description of the genre

Certain conventions and clichés were established that limited any surprises on the part of the reader to the details of the plot and, primarily, to the identity of the murderer. The majority of novels of that era were "whodunits", and several authors excelled, after misleading their readers successfully, in revealing the least likely suspect convincingly as the villain. There was also a predilection for certain casts of characters and certain settings in a secluded English country house and its upper-class inhabitants (although they were generally landed gentry; not aristocracy with their country house as a second house).

The rules of the game – and Golden Age mysteries were considered games – were codified in 1929 by Ronald Knox. According to Knox, a detective story

Knox's "Ten Commandments" (or "Decalogue") are as follows:

The criminal must be mentioned in the early part of the story, but must not be anyone whose thoughts the reader has been allowed to know.
All supernatural or preternatural agencies are ruled out as a matter of course.
Not more than one secret room or passage is allowable.
No hitherto undiscovered poisons may be used, nor any appliance which will need a long scientific explanation at the end.
No Chinaman must figure in the story.
No accident must ever help the detective, nor must he ever have an unaccountable intuition which proves to be right.
The detective himself must not commit the crime.
The detective is bound to declare any clues which he may discover.
The "sidekick" of the detective, the Watson, must not conceal from the reader any thoughts which pass through his mind: his intelligence must be slightly, but very slightly, below that of the average reader.
Twin brothers, and doubles generally, must not appear unless we have been duly prepared for them.

A similar but more detailed list of prerequisites was prepared by S. S. Van Dine in an article entitled "Twenty Rules for Writing Detective Stories" which appeared in The American Magazine in September 1928.  They are commonly referred to as Van Dine's Commandments.

In 1930, a group of British Golden Age authors came together to form the Detection Club. In addition to meeting for dinners and helping each other with technical aspects of their work, the members  agreed to adhere to Knox's Commandments. Anthony Berkeley was instrumental in setting up the club, and G. K. Chesterton was its first president. In 2015, Martin Edwards became the club's ninth president.

Decline and fall

The outbreak of the Second World War is often taken as a beginning of the end for the light-hearted, straightforward "whodunit" of the Golden Age. But as Ian Ousby writes, the Golden Age

Attacks on the genre were made by the influential writer and critic Julian Symons (who was dismissive of postwar detective fiction in Bloody Murder), Edmund Wilson ("Who Cares Who Killed Roger Ackroyd?"), and Raymond Chandler ("The Simple Art of Murder").<ref>Chandler, Raymond. "The Simple Art of Murder", The Atlantic Monthly". December 1944.</ref> But in sheer number of sales — particularly those of Agatha Christie  — modern detective fiction has never approached the popularity of Golden Age writing.

Enduring influence

Current writing influenced by the Golden Age style is often referred to as "cosy" mystery writing, as distinct from the "hardboiled" style popular in the United States. Recent writers working in this style include Sarah Caudwell, Ruth Dudley Edwards, Peter Lovesey and Simon Brett.  Television series that emulate the style include Murder, She Wrote and Midsomer Murders. Films and TV series based on the classic Golden Age novels continue to be produced.

The Country house mystery was a popular genre of English detective fiction in the 1920s and 1930s; set in the residences of the gentry and often involving a murder in a country house temporarily isolated by a snowstorm or similar with the suspects all at a weekend house party.

The board game Cluedo (Clue'' in North America) relies on the structure of the country house mystery.

From the late 1980s to the early 1990s, not a few mystery writers who were influenced by the Golden Age style made their debut one after another in Japan. Representative "new traditionalists" include writers such as Yukito Ayatsuji, Gosho Aoyama, Rintaro Norizuki and Taku Ashibe.

Notes

References

External links
 Golden Age of Detective Fiction Wiki
 Golden Age of Detective Fiction Yahoo Group

Detective fiction
Detective fiction